Eddie Engerth is a retired American soccer forward.

Playing career
Engerth first gained attention at William Tennent High School in Warminster Township, Bucks County, Pennsylvania, and then while playing on a Pennsylvania high school all-star team that toured Europe in 1969. After high school he played for Hartwick College before spending two seasons in the North American Soccer League with the Tampa Bay Rowdies and Philadelphia Atoms respectively. Later he played one season in the American Soccer League with the Connecticut Yankees.

References

External links
 NASL/ASL stats
 Philadelphia Atoms All Time Roster

Living people
1951 births
American soccer players
Hartwick Hawks men's soccer players
North American Soccer League (1968–1984) indoor players
North American Soccer League (1968–1984) players
Philadelphia Atoms players
Tampa Bay Rowdies (1975–1993) players
American Soccer League (1933–1983) players
Connecticut Wildcats soccer players
Association football forwards
People from Bucks County, Pennsylvania